Married Love is a 1923 British silent drama film directed by Alexander Butler and starring Lillian Hall-Davis, Rex Davis and Sydney Fairbrother. It was also known by the alternative titles Married Life and Maisie's Marriage. The film was loosely based on the 1918 non-fiction book Married Love by Marie Stopes.

Cast
 Lillian Hall-Davis as Maisie Burrows 
 Rex Davis as Dick Reading 
 Sydney Fairbrother as Mrs. Burrows 
 Sam Livesey as Mr. Burrows 
 Roger Livesey as Henry Burrows 
 Mary Brough as Mrs. Reading 
 Bert Darley as Mr. Sterling 
 Gladys Harvey as Mrs. Sterling

References

Bibliography
 Low, Rachael. History of the British Film, 1918-1929. George Allen & Unwin, 1971.

External links

Maisie's Marriage at BFI Player.

1923 films
1923 drama films
British drama films
British silent feature films
Films directed by Alexander Butler
British black-and-white films
1920s English-language films
1920s British films
Silent drama films